KULY (1420 AM) and KHGN (106.7 FM) are radio stations licensed to Ulysses, Kansas and Hugoton, Kansas, United States, respectively. KULY airs a classic hits format. KHGN airs a 1980s hits format. The stations are currently owned by Central Plains Finance LLC.

References

External links

ULY
Classic hits radio stations in the United States
Radio stations established in 1984